Aloïs Humbert (22 September 1829, in Geneva – 14 May 1887) was a Swiss naturalist and paleontologist who specialized in the study of myriapods. He also described new vertebrates (fishes, reptiles, mammals), molluscs and flatworms.

In 1852 he began work as a curator at the Musée d'histoire naturelle in Geneva, where he worked closely with François Jules Pictet. He was involved in scientific missions to Ceylon and to Syria / Lebanon, from which, he collected a large number of specimens for the museum. While in the Middle East, he made important discoveries of fossil fish.

Selected works 
 Monographie des chéloniens de la mollasse suisse, 1856.
 Description de quelques espèces nouvelles de planaires terrestres de Ceylan, 1862 – Description of some new species of terrestrial planarians from Ceylon.
 Essai sur les myriapodes de Ceylan, 1865 – Essay on myriapods of Ceylon.
 Nouvelles recherches sur les poissons fossiles du Mont Liban, 1866 (with François Jules Pictet) – New research on fossil fish from Mount Lebanon.
 Description de divers myriapodes du Musée de Vienne, 1869 – Description of various myriapods at the Vienna Museum.
 Études sur les myriapodes et les insectes, 1870 (with Henri de Saussure) – Studies of myriapods and insects.
 Description du Niphargus puteanus var. Forelii, 1876 – On Niphargus puteanus.
 Myriapodes des environs de Genève, 1893 (posthumous release, published by Henri de Saussure) – Myriapods in the vicinity of Geneva.

References 

1829 births
1877 deaths
Swiss naturalists
Swiss paleontologists
Scientists from Geneva